Best New Director was an award given by the New York Film Critics Circle from its first inception in 1989 until discontinuing in 1996. There was no award in 1993.

1980s

1989
Kenneth Branagh - Henry V
Runners-up: Steve Kloves - The Fabulous Baker Boys and Jim Sheridan - My Left Foot

1990s

1990
Whit Stillman - Metropolitan
Runners-up: John McNaughton - Henry: Portrait of a Serial Killer and Kevin Costner - Dances with Wolves

1991
John Singleton - Boyz n the Hood
Runner-up: Anthony Minghella - Truly, Madly, Deeply

1992
Allison Anders - Gas Food Lodging
Runners-up: Quentin Tarantino - Reservoir Dogs and Tim Robbins - Bob Roberts

1994
Darnell Martin - I Like It Like That
Runners-up: Kevin Smith - Clerks and David O. Russell - Spanking the Monkey

1995
Chris Noonan - Babe
Runners-up: Lodge Kerrigan - Clean, Shaven and Noah Baumbach - Kicking and Screaming

See also
John Cassavetes Award
MTV Movie Award for Best New Filmmaker

References

Awards established in 1989
Awards disestablished in 1996
New York Film Critics Circle Awards